Little Ghost Laban ( [Laban the Little Spook]) or "the ghost who wouldn't haunt", is a Swedish children's book character created by Inger and Lasse Sandberg from Karlstad, Sweden. The books revolve around the boy ghost Laban and his family, the Father ghost, the Mother ghost and Laban's sister Labolina. The first book about Laban was published in 1965.

Background 
Laban is a friendly character who does not want to haunt and scare people, and who lives in the basement of the castle "Gomorronsol" where he is friends with the youngest prince. The setting is domestic and shows the everyday life of the characters. The characters were created to help the creators' son Nicklas get over his fear of ghosts as a child.

Other characters created by the authors include The Thumb and Little Anna.

Books

See also
 List of ghosts
 Lilla Anna och Långa farbrorn another books series by the same authors

References

Fictional ghosts
Literary characters introduced in 1965
Book series introduced in 1965